Minions: The Rise of Gru (Original Motion Picture Soundtrack) is the soundtrack album for the film of the same name, released on July 1, 2022, through Decca Records. The Jack Antonoff-produced soundtrack consists of various contemporary artists covering famous funk, pop, and soul hits of the 1970s. "Turn Up the Sunshine" by Diana Ross and Tame Impala was released as the album's lead single on May 20, 2022. Four more singles followed, "Desafinado" by Kali Uchis, "Funkytown" by St. Vincent, "Hollywood Swinging" by Brockhampton, and "Dance to the Music" by H.E.R.

Track listing
All tracks produced by Jack Antonoff, except track 2 (produced by Antonoff and Mikey Freedom Hart), track 3 (produced by Antonoff and St. Vincent), track 18 produced by RZA and track 19 (produced by Heitor Pereira)

Personnel

Musicians

Jack Antonoff – guitar , drums , sound effects , bass , keyboards , percussion , mellotron , lead vocals , acoustic guitar , piano , electric guitar , background vocals , Wurlitzer electric piano , clavichord 
Phoebe Bridgers – lead vocals 
Matt Champion – vocals 
Gary Clark Jr. – lead vocals 
Pierre Coffin – lead vocals 
Sam Dew – background vocals 
Joba – vocals 
Cole Kamen-Green – tuba , trumpet 
Chris Kasych – electric guitar , keyboards 
Kevin Abstract – vocals 
G.E.M. – lead vocals 
Mikey Freedom Hart – guitar , Wurlitzer electric piano , Rhodes piano , keyboards , percussion , nylon string guitar , synthesizer programming , Hammond organ , bass , piano , organ 
Bobby Hawk – violin 
H.E.R. – lead vocals , guitar 
Brittany Howard – lead vocals 
Sean Hutchinson – drums 
Dom McLennon – vocals 
Kevin Parker – lead vocals , guitar , bass , keyboards , percussion 
Caroline Polachek – lead vocals 
Michael Riddleberger – drums , percussion 
Diana Ross – lead vocals 
RZA – lead vocals 
Alfie Silbert – clapping 
Evan Smith – background vocals , saxophone , flute , keyboards , horn , guitar , sound effects , piano 
St. Vincent – lead vocals , guitar , bass , sitar , vocal programming 
Thundercat – lead vocals 
Jackson Wang – lead vocals 
Weyes Blood – lead vocals 
Tierra Whack – lead vocals 
Verdine White – bass

Technical

Jack Antonoff – producer , recording engineer 
Chris Gehringer – mastering engineer 
Mikey Freedom Hart – additional producer 
Bobby Hawk – string arranger *Romil Hemnani – recording engineer 
Chris Kasych - recording engineer , mixing engineer 
Kevin Parker – recording engineer 
Heitor Pereira – producer 
Brian Rajaratnam – recording engineer 
John Rooney – assistant recording engineer , recording engineer 
Jon Sher – assistant recording engineer , recording engineer 
Laura Sisk – recording engineer , mixing engineer 
Mark "Spike" Stent – mixing engineer 
St. Vincent – producer , recording engineer 
Matt Wolach – assistant mixing engineer

Charts

References

2022 soundtrack albums
Animated film soundtracks
Albums produced by Jack Antonoff
Albums produced by St. Vincent (musician)
Decca Records soundtracks
Verve Records soundtracks
Pop soundtracks
Funk soundtracks
Soul soundtracks
Despicable Me